Robert Carter Nicholas (December 6, 1801 — May 10, 1854) was an American politician from New York.

Life
He was the son of Congressman John Nicholas (1764–1819). The family removed from Williamsburg, Virginia to Geneva, New York in 1803. He married Mary S. Rose (1809–1837), daughter of Congressman Robert S. Rose (1774–1835).

He was an Anti-Masonic member of the New York State Assembly (Ontario Co.) in 1828, 1829, 1830 and 1832.

He was a Whig member of the New York State Senate (7th D.) from 1839 to 1842, sitting in the 62nd, 63rd, 64th and 65th New York State Legislatures. He was a delegate to the New York State Constitutional Convention of 1846.

He and his wife were buried at the Pulteney Street Cemetery in Geneva.

Judge Robert C. Nicholas (1729–1780) was his grandfather; U.S. Senator Robert C. Nicholas (1793–1857) was his first cousin; Kentucky Attorney General George Nicholas (c. 1754–1799) and Governor Wilson Cary Nicholas (1761–1820) were his uncles; Congressman Robert L. Rose (1804–1877) was his brother-in-law..

Sources
The New York Civil List compiled by Franklin Benjamin Hough (pages 59, 132f, 144, 207ff, 212 and 294; Weed, Parsons and Co., 1858)
Pulteney Street Cemetery tombstone transcriptions (These were made in 1882, the cemetery was closed in 1920 and the burials removed to Glenwood Cemetery.)

1801 births
1854 deaths
New York (state) state senators
Politicians from Geneva, New York
Anti-Masonic Party politicians from New York (state)
Members of the New York State Assembly
New York (state) Whigs
19th-century American politicians
Politicians from Williamsburg, Virginia
Robert C